Kim Green may refer to:

 Kim Green (racing driver)
 Kim Green (virologist)
 Kimberlee Green, Australia netball international